This is a list of film festivals dedicated to machinima, the use of real-time 3-D engines in filmmaking. The Academy of Machinima Arts & Sciences (AMAS) regularly holds such festivals, and recognizes exemplary machinima works through awards nicknamed the Mackies.

Machinima Expo
The Machinima Expo (or "MachinExpo") is an annual international machinima festival started in 2008. In 2010 the organization expanded and is now run with help of a large team of volunteers. Submission is accepted during the summer months and the event takes place in November on the Internet and in the virtual world of Second Life".

2008 Jury Award Nominees

Liberty City, directed by Claus-Dieter Schulz Liberty City
An UnfairWar, directed by Thuyen Nguyen
The SnowWitch, directed by Michelle Pettit-Mee
Tiny Nation, directed by Kerria Seabrooke
Among Fables and Men, directed by Tobias Lundmark
Clear Skies, directed by Ian Chisolm
Beast, directed by Leo Lucien-Bay
The DumbMan, directed by Trace Sanderson
Wizard of OS: The Fish Incident, directed by Tom Jantol

2002 Machinima Film Festival
On July 17, 2002, the first Machinima Film Festival, sponsored by NVIDIA, was held as part of QuakeCon 2002. However, according to David Stellmack of TG Daily, the larger QuakeCon event seemed to overshadow the festival, which was "not very well attended".

2003 Machinima Film Festival

2005 Machinima Film Festival
The 2005 Machinima Film Festival was held on November 12, 2005 at the American Museum of the Moving Image in Astoria, New York.

2006 Machinima Festival

Machinima Festival Europe 2007

The first Machinima Festival Europe was held in Leicester on 12–14 October 2007. The festival was hosted by De Montfort University’s Institute of Creative Technologies (IOCT), and supported by the AMAS.

Speakers
Burnie Burns, Rooster Teeth Productions
Alex Chan, Machinimator
Frank Dellario, The Electric Sheep Company
Ricard Gras, Inter-Activa
Hugh Hancock, Strange Company
Tracy Harwood, De Montfort University
Deryck Houghton, Freeth Cartwright
Andrew Hugill, Institute of Creative Technologies
Johnnie Ingram, Strange Company
Matt Kelland, Moviestorm
Friedrich Kirschner, AMAS
Xavier Lardy, Machinima.fr
Xin Kai Li, De Montfort University
Matthew Linley, Phoenix Arts Centre
Mary Mackintosh, De Montfort University
Paul Marino, The ILL Clan
John C Martin II, Reallusion
Toby Moores, Sleepydog
Klaus Neumann, Screen Magazine
Kate Pullinger, De Montfort University
Jason Saldana, Rooster Teeth Productions
Sue Thomas, De Montfort University
Martyn Ware, Illustrious Company

Awards
As part of the festival, exemplary machinima productions were recognised with awards presented by Toby Moores, Visiting Professor at the IOCT and CEO of Sleepydog.

2008 Machinima Film Festival

Notes

References

External links
 
 Machinima Festival Europe 2007

Machinima
Festivals
machinima